The 1904 United States presidential election in North Carolina took place on November 8, 1904. All contemporary 45 states were part of the 1904 United States presidential election. North Carolina voters chose 12 electors to the Electoral College, which selected the president and vice president.

Background and vote
Following the overthrow of its Populist/Republican fusion government by white Democrats in the 1898 Wilmington coup d‘etat, North Carolina would see a radical restructuring of its politics due to the disenfranchisement of its large African-American population. These African-American voters had provided a substantial proportion of Republican Party support ever since that party first appeared in the state following Reconstruction. However, unlike the Deep South, even without black voting the Republican Party retained substantial support from whites in the mountain and northwestern Piedmont areas that had resisted secession and viewed the Democratic Party as a “war party”. This would allow the GOP, without threatening statewide Democratic hegemony, to gain one-third of the statewide vote in general elections.

This radically altered Republican Party would turn almost overnight towards a “lily-white” strategy based on attempting to appeal to businessmen who found the Democratic Party too anti-business and too favourable to using low-cost black labor instead of whites. The GOP had to some extent followed this strategy in the years before black disenfranchisement because it wanted to appeal to the state’s budding industrialists, who were critical of Democratic policies favoring free trade over high tariffs. Although this strategy had allowed William McKinley to retain almost the same share of North Carolina’s reduced electorate in 1900 that he had won with large-scale black voting in 1896, Republican nominee Theodore Roosevelt would decline substantially in 1904, due to a shift to a more pro-business Democratic candidate and opposition to Roosevelt’s hosting of Booker T. Washington. The Republicans were reduced to their traditionally Unionist mountain strongholds, with the exception of former Populist Senator Marion Butler's home county of Sampson, which persisted in its newfound Republican orientation.

North Carolina was won by the Democratic nominees, Chief Judge Alton B. Parker of New York and his running mate Henry G. Davis of West Virginia.

Results

Results by county

References

Notes

North Carolina
1904
1904 North Carolina elections